André Revillon d'Apreval was a French botanical illustrator and lithographer, active 1875–1910, and known for his images in Plantae Davidianae (1884–88), Illustrationes Florae Insularum Maris Pacifici (1886–92) and Histoire physique, naturelle et politique de Madagascar (1882).
Henri Ernest Baillon, the French physician and botanist, and main contributor to Histoire physique, naturelle et politique de Madagascar, named a new genus d'Aprevalia after him in 1884, no doubt in honour of his illustrating the work, but the name was later placed under Delonix by René Paul Raymond Capuron.
A number of species such as Commiphora aprevalii (Baill.) Guillaumin, were named to commemorate him.

Associated names
Émile De Wildeman (1866–1947) Botanist
Théophile Durand (1855–1912) Botanist
Charles Cuisin (1832–1900) Illustrator  
Berthe Hérincq Illustrator  
Philippe Dautzenberg (1849–1935) Malacologist
Victor De Clèves Botanist

Works illustrated
Histoire physique, naturelle et politique de Madagascar (1882)
Plantae Davidianae ex Sinarum imperio (1884–88)
Illustrationes florae insularum maris pacifici (1886-1892)
Illustrations de la flore du Congo by E. de Wildeman (1898)
Plantae Novae vel Minus Cognitae ex herbario Horti Thenensis (1904)
Atlas de poche des coquilles des côtes de France (Manche, océan, Méditerranée) communes, pittoresques ou comestibles by Ph Dautzenberg (2014) 
Tableau des principaux champignons comestibles & veneneux by Paul Dumée
Oeuvre de A. d'Apreval by A. d' Apreval 
Nouvelles Archives du Muséum d'Histoire Naturelle, Paris

External links
Gallery of plates at plantillustrations.org

References

Botanical illustrators
French illustrators
Place of birth missing
Year of birth missing
Year of death missing